Gazan Ashehi (also Romanized as Gazān Āshehī; also known as Gazān Hāshtī) is a village in Damen Rural District, in the Central District of Iranshahr County, Sistan and Baluchestan Province, Iran. At the 2006 census, its population was 119, in 23 families.

References 

Populated places in Iranshahr County